Rodach may refer to several locations in southern Germany:

 Rodach (Itz), a tributary of the Itz river
 Rodach (Main), a tributary of the Main river
 Wilde Rodach, also a tributary of the Main river
 Bad Rodach, a city in the district of Coburg, Bavaria
 Marktrodach, a city in the district of Kronach, Bavaria